The Southern Lakes is an unofficial name given to an area of the southern South Island of New Zealand. Despite being an unofficial designation, the term Southern Lakes is sometimes used by organisations such as the New Zealand Meteorological Service  and Automobile Association.

The region is generally lightly populated, with much of its southwestern part being uninhabited national park. Much of the scenery was heavily glaciated during the last ice age, and as such contains many broad U-shaped valleys, several of which are filled with large lakes. These include the country's deepest lake, Lake Hauroko, and three of the country's four largest lakes. If the Mackenzie Basin is included, seven of the country's ten largest lakes form part of the Southern Lakes.

Many of the region's lakes feed the country's second-longest river, the Clutha River, and its tributaries — these include Lakes Wakatipu, Wānaka, and Hāwea, as well as the artificial lakes Dunstan (formed on the river by a hydroelectric dam at Clyde) and Roxburgh (formed behind a similar but smaller dam at Roxburgh). Other lakes, such as Te Anau and Manapouri, feed the system of the Waiau River. The northern group of Mackenzie Basin lakes form part of the Waitaki River system.

The areas main centres of population are Queenstown and Wānaka in Otago, and Te Anau in Southland.

List of lakes

Those listed as being in Canterbury are often excluded from definitions of the Southern Lakes.

Other notable lakes include the Mavora Lakes of Southland, Lake Hayes in Otago, and the artificial Lake Ruataniwha, part of the Canterbury-Otago boundary.

References

Lakes of Otago
Lakes of Canterbury, New Zealand
Lakes of Southland, New Zealand